"Diamonds" is a single by Starboy Nathan, taken from his second album 3D - Determination, Dedication, Desire. The single was released on 17 April 2011 on digital download and CD single. The song charted at number 23 in the UK Singles Chart. The song has over 1.7 million views on Youtube.

Track listings

Digital download, CD Single
 "Diamonds" (Radio Edit) - 3:33

Digital EP
 "Diamonds" (Radio Edit) - 3;33
 "Diamonds" (Wideboys Radio Mix) - 3:27
 "Diamonds" (Wideboys Club Mix) - 6:16
 "Diamonds" (Wideboys Dub) - 6:16

Chart performance

Release history

References

2011 singles
2011 songs